Gonga may refer to:

Gonga, Bam, Burkina Faso
Gonga, Comoé, Burkina Faso
Gonga (band), a British rock band
Gonga languages of Ethiopia